Tom Davin is an American businessman known as the CEO of Panda Restaurant Group.

Early life
Davin graduated from Duke University in 1979.  He then joined the military where he served four years of infantry command assignments included roles as a company commander in 1st Recon Battalion and 3rd Recon Battalion, followed by selection to become an infantry tactics instructor at the USMC officer course, The Basic School, in Quantico VA.  Davin obtained the rank of captain.  He then attended Harvard Business School, graduating in 1987 with a MBA.

Career
Davin began his business career in the mergers group of Goldman Sachs and PepsiCo. He served as Chief Operating Officer of Taco Bell Corporation from 1996 to 2000. From August 2004 to November 2009, Davin served as the CEO of Panda Restaurant Group.  Later, in 2010, he became the CEO of 5.11 Tactical until his retirement on 4 September 2018. Tom Davin is currently working with Black Rifle Coffee Company as Co-CEO alongside former Green Beret and founding CEO Evan Hafer.

References 

Duke University alumni
Living people
Year of birth missing (living people)
Harvard Business School alumni
American chief executives
Place of birth missing (living people)
American chief operating officers